Sicyopterus ocellaris is a species of goby that is only known from the Nuru River, in northeastern Papua New Guinea.  This species can reach a length of  SL.

References

ocellaris
Freshwater fish of Indonesia
Taxa named by Philippe Keith
Taxa named by Gerald R. Allen
Taxa named by Clara Lord
Fish described in 2012